Lincoln Heights is one of the oldest neighborhoods in Los Angeles, California, United States. It was originally called "East Los Angeles" from 1873 to 1917. It is a densely populated, mostly Latino and Asian neighborhood. It includes many historic landmarks and was known as "the Bedroom of the Pueblo".

History

Yaangna Village was located on what is now the current day site of Downey Park on Albion and Avenue 17. Lincoln Heights is considered to be one of the oldest neighborhoods outside of La Placita / Sonoratown dating to the 1870s and is found wholly within the original Spanish four leagues pueblo of the Los Angeles land grant. Located on bluffs overlooking the Los Angeles River and immersed in the floodplain, Lincoln Heights river adjacent land became the city's first Industrial Corridor. Aided by slave labor of the Kizh, it later became the home to some of the city's most notable downtown industrialists, who built numerous Victorian homes, some of which have been preserved under the city's historic preservation ordinance.  

In 1863, John Strother Griffin purchased  of ranch land for $1,000 and in 1870, Griffin and his nephew, Hancock Johnson, built homes there. In late 1874, they offered an additional  for sale, subdivided into  lots for $150 each. The neighborhood was known as "East Los Angeles" between 1873 and 1917 when residents voted to change the name to Lincoln Heights.

The area was the first suburban neighborhood of Los Angeles, having been subdivided in 1873. Lincoln Heights was well located to serve as a home for people who worked in the industrial areas lining the Los Angeles River and wanted to live upstream. By the late 1880s a neighborhood commercial district had been built around the intersection of North Broadway and Truman Streets, with business buildings such as the Hayden Block. This is identified as the first suburban neighborhood shopping district in Los Angeles; it was  demolished in the mid-20th century to make way for I-5, the Golden State Freeway.

Thereafter, what would be known as North Broadway became a crowded commercial thoroughfare, and by the turn of the 20th century, unfettered industrial construction and numerous rock crushing operations within the once scenic floodplain made it less appealing for Angelenos of means, who moved out first to the Arroyo Seco area and Hollywood, then (from the 1920s onward) to rapidly developing Mid-Wilshire. As wealthy residents departed, Lincoln Heights became home to a large Italian American population, as well as some Irish American and French American (the 1850s era immigration) residents by the 1930s, also a wave of poor white American residents known as "Okies" from the Great Plains moved into the area. With an increasingly large Mexican American population, Lincoln Heights became a 'barrio by the 1960s. It and its cross-river neighbor "Little Italy" (what is now Chinatown) formed the heart of southern California's Italian-American community.

In the 21st century, Lincoln Heights has slowly been gentrifying due to Los Angeles' land use policies. Activists claim the LA River revitalization, the Cornfield Arroyo Specific Plan, and the upzoning of previous industrial land (oldest industrial corridor in the city) for luxury housing threatens the health, safety and welfare of an historically vulnerable community.

Demographics

Based on the 2019 Census estimates, Lincoln Heights has a population of 39,916 residents.

The neighborhood has a relatively high percentage of both Latino and Asian residents. The breakdown was Latinos, 66.2%;  Asians, 23.4%;  whites, 7.8%; blacks, 0.4%; and others, 1.0%.  Mexico (57.0%) and Vietnam (16.9%) were the most common places of birth for the 55.8% of the residents who were born abroad—which was a high percentage for Los Angeles.

The median yearly household income in 2008 dollars was $30,579, considered low for the city. Renters occupied 75.9% of the housing stock, and house- or apartment-owners held 24.1%. The average household size of 3.6 people was considered high for Los Angeles.

The percentages of never-married men (53.0%) and women (40.6%) were among the county's highest. The 19.5% of families headed by single parents was considered about average for city neighborhoods. There were 500 veterans, or 2.8% of the population, a low proportion compared to the rest of the city.

Lincoln Heights ranks in the 94th-100th percentile of environmentally burdened communities according to CalEnviroScreen 4.0

Arts and culture

Public libraries

The Lincoln Heights Branch of the Los Angeles Public Library is on Workman Street.

Landmarks
Lincoln Park
San Antonio Winery, (founded 1917), oldest operating business in Lincoln Heights
Los Angeles Alligator Farm
Selig Polyscope Company
The Brewery Art Colony
Church of the Epiphany, oldest operating Episcopal church in Los Angeles; Cesar Chavez gave speeches in the church hall and La Raza was printed in the church basement
Lincoln Heights Jail
Heritage Square Museum

Education
Just 5.5% of Lincoln Heights residents aged 25 and older had earned a four-year degree by 2000, a low percentage for the city.

Schools

Public
 Abraham Lincoln High School, 3501 North Broadway
 Academy of Environmental & Social Policy (ESP) at Lincoln High, 3501 North Broadway
 Hillside Elementary School, 120 East Avenue 35
 Alliance College-Ready Middle Academy No. 5, charter, 2635 Pasadena Avenue
 Pueblo de Los Angeles Continuation School, 2506 Alta Street
 Gates Street Elementary School, 3333 Manitou Avenue
 Albion Street Elementary School, 322 South Avenue 18
 Griffin Avenue Elementary School, 2025 Griffin Avenue
 Milagro Charter Elementary School, 1855 North Main Street
 Los Angeles Leadership Academy High School (LALA HS), 234 W Avenue 33
 Alliance College Ready Middle Academy #5 (ACRMA #5)
 Alliance Susan & Eric Smidt Technology High School
 East Los Angeles Skill Center (Adult Education), 3921 Selig Place 

PUC Schools operates the Milagro Charter School (K-5) and the Excel Charter Academy (6-8) in Lincoln Heights.

Private
 Little Flower Missionary House, elementary, 2434 Gates Street (closed August 31, 2017).
 Sacred Heart High School, 2111 Griffin Avenue
 Sacred Heart Elementary School, 2109 Sichel Street

Infrastructure

Transportation
Major thoroughfares include Valley Boulevard; Mission Road; Pasadena Avenue; North Main, Marengo, Daly, and Figueroa Streets; and North Broadway.  The Golden State Freeway (I-5) runs through the district, and the Metro L Line has a station in the far northwestern portion of the district.

Fire services

Los Angeles Fire Department Fire Station No. 1 is located in the Lincoln Heights area. The station is in the Battalion 2 district.

Healthcare
The Los Angeles County Department of Public Health operates the Central Health Center in Downtown Los Angeles, serving Lincoln Heights.

Notable people

 Frank Capra, film director 
 John Strother Griffin, the founder of East Los Angeles
 Kenny Washington, football player
 Cesar Chavez, during the "No on 22" campaign in November 1972, he temporarily resided in Lincoln Heights at a private residence on corner of Workman and Baldwin streets  
Daniel Lewis James, author
Eldridge Cleaver, Black Panther Party's Minister of Information
Gregory Ain, architect

In popular culture
Police (1916) 
Take a Chance (1918) 
Detained (1924) 
Assault on Precinct 13 (1976)
A Nightmare on Elm Street (1984) 
Blood In Blood Out (1993)
Changeling (2008)

See also

 Los Angeles Historic-Cultural Monuments on the East and Northeast Sides

References

External links

Official website for the Lincoln Heights Neighborhood Council

Lincoln Heights
Neighborhoods in Los Angeles
Eastside Los Angeles
Los Angeles Historic Preservation Overlay Zones
Little Italys in the United States
Italian-American culture in Los Angeles